Flogeken Glacier is a deeply entrenched glacier, flowing northwest between Mount Grytoyr and Langfloget Cliff, in the Mühlig-Hofmann Mountains of Queen Maud Land, Antarctica. it was mapped by Norwegian cartographers from surveys and air photos by the Sixth Norwegian Antarctic Expedition (1956–60) and named Flogeken (the rock wall spoke).

See also
 List of glaciers in the Antarctic
 Glaciology

References 

Glaciers of Queen Maud Land
Princess Martha Coast